Ján Greguš (born 29 January 1991) is a Slovak professional footballer who plays as a midfielder for Nashville SC and the Slovakia national team.

Club career
Greguš began playing football at the hometown club Nitra. On 20 May 2009, he made his senior debut in Corgoň Liga against Spartak Trnava at the age of 18.

After four games for Nitra, Greguš signed for Baník Ostrava in July 2009. He scored his first goal in a 1–0 away win against Hradec Králové on 8 April 2012.

In January 2013 Greguš joined English Championship club Bolton Wanderers on loan with Wanderers manager Dougie Freedman stating he would initially be part of the club's development squad. He scored on his development squad debut against Manchester City in a 3–3 draw. After one year at Bolton Wanderers during which he mostly played for the development squad Greguš returned to Baník Ostrava.

Greguš moved to Jablonec mid-season during the 2014–15 campaign. He went on to make 36 appearances scoring 6 goals before leaving the club.

On 19 June 2016, the Danish club Copenhagen announced the signing of Greguš on a four-year contract.

On 20 December 2018, Minnesota United announced the signing of Greguš as their third designated player.

Greguš was selected by San Jose Earthquakes in Stage 2 of the 2021 MLS Re-Entry Draft on 23 December 2021. He signed with the club on 6 January 2022.

On 17 March 2023, Greguš signed with Nashville SC on a deal until the end of the 2023 season.

International career
Greguš debuted in Slovakia senior team on 31 March 2015 against Czech Republic. In the 49th minute of the game he assisted Ondrej Duda for the winning goal of the match. By the end of the year, he was also fielded for matches against Spain, Switzerland and Iceland.

Two years later, in his 12th cap for the national team, Greguš scored his first goal in the senior squad. This was in the 42nd minute of a qualifying match for a 2018 FIFA World Cup against Malta in Ta'Qali, when Greguš's right-foot shot slipped under Andrew Hogg. At that time, the score was tied 1–1, after an early goal by Vladimír Weiss (2nd minute), followed by 14th-minute equalizer by Jean Paul Farrugia. Slovakia went on to win the game 3–1 and moved to the second position of the Group F table, after five of the ten matches played. After the match, Greguš said that this goal was "so far, the most important" 
goal in his career.

In 2018, he was fielded for the 90 minutes of the final match of the 2018 King's Cup against Thailand (3–2 victory), winning his first trophy with Slovakia, after being benched in the semi-finals against UAE. 
Later in the year, he scored his second international goal in a friendly fixture against Morocco, as a part of  their preparation for 2018 FIFA World Cup. He scored with a right-foot shot from the outside of the penalty box, after calling the ball ahead Albert Rusnák, who got the assist. Greguš only played the second half of the game, replacing the captain Marek Hamšík. Slovakia lost the game 2–1.

Career statistics

Club

International 

Scores and results list Slovakia's goal tally first, score column indicates score after each Greguš goal.

Honours
Copenhagen
Danish Superliga: 2016–17
Danish Cup: 2016–17

Slovakia
King's Cup: 2018

References

External links

BANIK OSTRAVA 2014 season highlights

1991 births
Living people
Sportspeople from Nitra
Association football midfielders
Slovak footballers
Slovakia youth international footballers
Slovakia under-21 international footballers
Slovakia international footballers
FC Nitra players
FC Baník Ostrava players
Bolton Wanderers F.C. players
FK Jablonec players
F.C. Copenhagen players
Minnesota United FC players
San Jose Earthquakes players
Nashville SC players
Slovak Super Liga players
Czech First League players
Danish Superliga players
Major League Soccer players
Designated Players (MLS)
UEFA Euro 2016 players
UEFA Euro 2020 players
Slovak expatriate footballers
Slovak expatriate sportspeople in the Czech Republic
Expatriate footballers in the Czech Republic
Slovak expatriate sportspeople in England
Expatriate footballers in England
Slovak expatriate sportspeople in Denmark
Expatriate men's footballers in Denmark
Slovak expatriate sportspeople in the United States
Expatriate soccer players in the United States